The United States House Natural Resources Subcommittee on Oversight and Investigations is one of the five subcommittees within the House Natural Resources Committee. It was established in 2015 by Chairman Rob Bishop of Utah.

The Subcommittee on Oversight and Investigations has primary and general oversight and investigative authority on all activities, policies and programs within the jurisdiction of the Committee.

Members, 117th Congress

Historical membership rosters

115th Congress

116th Congress

References

External Links
Subcommittee page

Natural Resources Oversight